Nadiya Andriyivna Vasina (born 11 July 1989), best known as Nadya Vasina, is a Ukrainian gymnast and entertainer. She was a member of Ukraine women's artistic gymnastics national team in 2002–2008, and won two gold medals in team at the 2006 Gymnasiade and 2007 Universiade. She cooperated with Cirque du Soleil, and created her own Passion Show.

Biography  

Nadya Vasina was born in Kiev, Ukraine, to a family involved in arts and sports.

Her mother was part of the USSR athletic team and now works as a translator. Her father created the first Ukrainian radio stations and some big musical projects, and now works as a main manager of a municipal radio station. Nadya spent all her childhood and youth involved in sports. After finishing her sport career, she started to work as artist of an original genre creating her authorised shows and performing all over the world.

Nadya is known for her flexibility. She has appeared on multiple media platforms, and has gained particular notoriety for being able to fold her body completely in half.

Vasina has garnered attraction for various shows and performances which carry themes of love, lust or greed. Her most famous show; "Rose" which involves Nadya in a red short dress finding a rose from a previous lover, Vasina proceeds to dance and perform to the rose, placing it between her toes and placing them in her mouth. In her show "Money" Vasina starts as a banker in a black suit and shoes, over the course of the performance Vasina realises she is surrounded by money and dances around, on top of, and with the money. Eventually Nadya transforms into a golden plated goddess of money, seduced by the money itself. By the end of the performance, Nadya has reverted to her normal self, pulling a note of money from her pocket, hinting at the ordeal having really taken place. Vasina often interprets her feet and legs into her performances.

Sport career  
 At the age of 3, Nadya started dancing, swimming, and skating. In 1996 at the age of 7 she started to do rhythmic gymnastics. In 1998 took part in a big FIAT commercial project in Bombey, India. At the age of 12 in 2002, Nadya was taken to the national team of Ukraine to Albina and Irina Deriugina where she signed the contract. In 2003, she received the title Master of Sports of Ukraine and became Master of Sports of International Class (MSIC) in 2004. Also she got the permission of making the first European championships in Ukraine. Until 2008 Vasina was performing in the national team. 
 Performed on Grand Prix, World Wide Cups, European Championships, World Championships, Worldwide Gimnasiade, Worldwide Gymnasiad, Ukrainian championships etc.  
 2006 - winner of Worldwide Gymnasiade (group) 
 2007 - winner of Worldwide Universiade (group) 
 2007 - she received the honorary award "For Endurance and Work" from President of Ukraine Victor Yushchenko. Finished sport career.

Artistic career

2008-2009
Worked with Cirque du Soleil. on the "OVO" show

2010

 Took part in a Russia's Got Talent TV series, Minuta slavy, in Moscow.
 authorised the show named "Passion show" and announcing the future presentation of the show on TV 
 26 October 2011 was the presentation of the show — «Страсть Шоу» "Passion Show"  This year Nadya signed the contract with producer Oleg German.
 On this big event many Ukrainian media were present.

2012
 The magazine "The most beautiful woman of Ukraine. National property" named Vasina the most beautiful woman of Ukraine.

2013
 On December issue Nadya appears on the cover of Russian Chicago.

2014-2015
 The cabaret show "Illusio" open their doors for the audience and Nadya became one of the main characters with her authorised act "Rose". 
 In August 2015 Nadya again was included to the list of the most beautiful woman of Ukraine "Самые красивые женщины Украины"

Activism  
After Russia annexed Crimea and the war in Donetsk and Lughansk regions started, Vasina became a volunteer for Ukrainian army. She visits the soldiers and shows herself in public with the Ukraine national flag with applied Coat of arms of Ukraine expressing her "worries about the integrity of the country".

References

External links 
  

1989 births
Living people
Showgirls
Gymnasts from Kyiv
Ukrainian rhythmic gymnasts
Universiade medalists in gymnastics
Universiade gold medalists for Ukraine
21st-century Ukrainian women